Resource Link Charter School is a public charter school in Coos Bay, Oregon, United States.

Academics
The 2011-2012 district report card indicated an overall school rating of Satisfactory. In 2013, the rate of on time graduation was 57%, which was 4% higher than the district average.

References

Charter schools in Oregon
High schools in Coos County, Oregon
Coos Bay, Oregon
Public elementary schools in Oregon
Public middle schools in Oregon
Education in Coos County, Oregon
Public high schools in Oregon